Riaan Manser (born 1973) is an explorer based in South Africa. He has done his exploring on a bicycle or a kayak.

Notable firsts

He was the first person to circumnavigate the coast of Africa by bicycle, a distance of 37,000 km, through 34 countries over two years and two months. In July 2009 he became the first person to kayak 5,000 km around Madagascar, alone and unaided. Both journeys are covered in his books, Around Africa on My Bicycle (Jonathan Ball Publishers, 2007) and Around Madagascar on my Kayak (Jonathan Ball Publishers, 2011). In 2011 he also circumnavigated Iceland in a two-man kayak with Dan Skinstad.. His most recent journey, "Take Me 2 New York" started in December 2013 with his long-time girlfriend, Vasti Geldenhuys. They rowed from Morocco, Africa to New York City, USA in an ocean rowing boat alone and unaided.

Africa365 - Circumnavigating Africa by Bicycle September 2003 - November 2006

Cycling an average of 90 km a day, often in extreme conditions, being thrown into jail in Equatorial Guinea by aggressive and drunken border police, and facing possible death when taken hostage by drugged Liberian teenage rebels may not be a conventional idea of truly 'living', but, in September 2003, Riaan Manser rode out of Cape Town, determined to become the first person to circumnavigate Africa by bicycle. He thought it would take him a year; it took him over two.

At the end of 2005, he cycled back into Cape Town, 14 kg lighter, having covered 36,500 km through 34 countries. Intending to use his journey to generate local and international awareness of the often appalling standard of living in Africa, Riaan was also propelled by a strong desire for African adventure, a desire that was inevitably fulfilled.

In Around Africa on my Bicycle, Riaan allows the reader to relive the toil, excitement and occasional terror of his journey - negotiating the Sahara and Libyan deserts, learning French, Portuguese and Arabic, eating monkey, rat and bat, standing in front of the pyramids, being awarded the freedom of the Red Sea in Egypt, feeding hyenas mouth to mouth, and standing on the highest, as well as at the lowest, points in Africa. Remarkably, Riaan never paid a single cent in bribe money. Instead of giving over zealous immigration officials or police the satisfaction of a bribe, Riaan would search for an alternative route or method to pass.

He was honoured with the "Adventurer of the Year" Award in 2006 by Out There Magazine, and Nelson Mandela personally requested a meeting with Riaan, at which Riaan presented Mandela with a photo of himself on a bicycle in Dakar.

Round the Outside - Circumnavigating Madagascar by Kayak August 2008 - July 2009

In July 2009 Riaan again set another world first when he became the first person to circumnavigate the world's fourth largest island of Madagascar by kayak; another expedition achieved alone and unaided.

Riaan travelled around Madagascar during a period of the country's most significant political turmoil, which gave him unrivalled insight into the exotic island's psyche and even earned him two nights in prison on suspicion of carrying out mercenary activities.

This incredible journey, 5000 km in eleven months, was considerably more demanding, both physically and mentally. Daily, Riaan had to conquer extreme loneliness whilst ploughing through treacherous conditions such as cyclones, pounding surf and an unrelenting sun that, combined with up to ten hours in salt water, was literally pickling his body. The perseverance, of course, brought memorable close encounters with Madagascar's marine life – humpback whales breaching meters away from his kayak, giant leatherback turtles gliding alongside him and even having his boat rammed by sharks.

Around Iceland on Inspiration March 2011 -September 2011

In March 2011 Riaan took on his next challenge - mystical Iceland and her arctic waters - with partner, Dan Skinstad, who has mild cerebral palsy. "Around Iceland on Inspiration" saw the two paddle 2300 km to circumnavigate Iceland in a double sea-kayak over a five-month period.

Only once they'd begun their circumnavigation did they realise just how challenging the weather would be. They knew that the inclement winter weather would cause delays but they could never have predicted how often and how long these delays would be.

Landings were another of the pair's biggest challenges. Approaching rocky shores that are being pounded by wind and surf is a hazardous business. Between timings and luck, you're a second away from disaster at any moment. Their landings were made even more difficult because of their "sea-legs" which they'd develop after a long day's paddle of 8 – 10 hours. Often, even the softest landings would result in Riaan and Dan spluttering and crawling for a few moments on the black sand on all fours after tumbling out of the boat during the landing.

As the long days of summer arrived, the pair began paddling through the night. This proved to be a successful strategy, although it messed up their sleep patterns.

On 5 September 2011, after 147 paddling days, blistered and aching, they arrived back at their starting point, their circumnavigation complete.

No Food For Lazy Man

NO FOOD FOR LAZY MAN is an initiative, started by Riaan, to bring about social change by investing in sporting equipment for schools that don't have access to these resources. The trust takes its name from a phrase Riaan discovered during his Africa circumnavigation. It was a seed planted in his imagination, and as he pedaled, the idea grew.

In preparation for Iceland, Riaan spent 8 days in a container freezer touring South Africa from Kings Park rugby stadium in Durban to Newlands rugby stadium in Cape Town. The idea was two-fold: to prepare himself for the freezing Icelandic temperatures as well as to raise funds for his NO FOOD FOR LAZY MAN trust.

External links
 
 Africa365 website

References

1973 births
Living people
South African male cyclists